The Linnean Tercentenary Medal was commissioned in 2007 by the Linnean Society to commemorate the tercentenary of the birth of Carl Linnaeus. Recipients were in two categories: Silver Medal and Bronze Medal, for outstanding contributions to natural history.

The front of the medal features an illustration by Linnaeus of Andromeda (mythology) next to one of the plant he named Andromeda, from his 1732 expedition to Lapland and on the back, a spiral design made from illustrations taken from Systema Naturae.

Silver Medal 
 Sir David Attenborough CBE, Hon. FLS, FRS
 Professor Steve Jones FRS, FLS
 Professor Edward O. Wilson FMLS, ForMemRS

Bronze Medal 
 Ms Gina Douglas FLS
 Dr Jenny Edmonds FLS
 Professor Carl-Olof Jacobsen FLS
 Professor Bengt Jonsell FLS
 Dr Martyn Rix FLS
 Mr Nigel Rowland FLS
 Ms Elaine Shaughnessy FLS

See also

 List of biology awards

References

External links 
 The Linnean Tercentenary Medal: The Linnean Society of London

Biology awards
Commemoration of Carl Linnaeus